The International Confederation of Midwives (ICM) supports, represents and works to strengthen professional associations of midwives on a global basis. At present, ICM has over 100 members, representing midwifery associations in around 100 countries.

The ICM works with midwives and midwifery associations globally to secure women’s rights and access to midwifery care before, during and after childbirth. The ICM has worked alongside UN agencies and other partners for decades in global initiatives to help reduce the numbers of mothers and babies who die in and around childbirth, and evidence is growing that shows expanding midwifery care is one of the best ways to combat maternal mortality. The drive for safer motherhood continues to gain strength as more women worldwide achieve access to midwifery care.

Vision 
ICM envisions a world where every childbearing woman has access to a midwife's care for herself and her newborn.

Mission 
ICM seeks to strengthen member associations and to advance the profession of midwifery globally by promoting autonomous midwives as the most appropriate caregivers for childbearing women and in keeping birth normal, in order to enhance the reproductive health of women, and the health of their newborn and their families.

Projects

Midwifery education 
 "ICM Global standards for midwifery education"  are one of the essential pillars of ICM’s efforts to strengthen midwifery worldwide by preparing fully qualified midwives to provide high quality, evidence-based health services for women, newborns and childbearing families. 
The education standards were developed in tandem with the update of essential competencies for basic midwifery practice, which define the core content of any midwifery education programme. They are available on the ICM Website in English, French and Spanish.

History
It is known that midwives have been making efforts to meet internationally for over 100 years. There are records of a midwives´ conference held in Berlin, Germany, in the year 1900, when over 1,000 midwives attended. This was arranged at a time without the use of telephones, computers, credit cards or aeroplanes, and women travelling on their own was difficult and not always acceptable.
 
In 1919, a group of European midwives, centred in Antwerp, Belgium, established the first beginnings of what was to become the International Confederation of Midwives. By this time, many countries already had a national association of midwives; communication among them increased and a series of regular meetings was launched.
 
During the 1930s and 1940s, travel and communication in Europe was disrupted by war and unrest. Unfortunately, the detailed records of the earlier midwives´ meetings and documents were destroyed. However, the desire to continue international work was still strong. In 1954, the initiative grew again and this time the location was London, UK. For the first time, the name of ´International Confederation of Midwives´ was decided, and also the idea of regular triennial congresses was established. Since 1954 the series of such meetings every three years has remained unbroken.
 
The ICM now has over 100 members – all autonomous midwifery associations, from around 100 countries spanning four regions: Africa, Asia Pacific, the Americas and Europe. Each member association sends delegates to the ICM Council, which is the overall governing body; each region elects representatives to a smaller board, which oversees the continuing business of the Confederation.
 
The ICM Council decided in 1999 to move the location of the headquarters office from London to The Hague, in the Netherlands, and it has been established there ever since. The headquarters permanent staff has increased from the appointment in 1987 of one part-time executive secretary, to the present larger group including the Secretary General, Programme Co-ordinator, Communications Manager and other part-time administrative assistance. The ICM journal, International Midwifery, is now in its 18th year of communicating "to, from and among midwives across the world" and the ICM website at www.internationalmidwives.org has been assisting speedier access to ICM news and activities since 2000.
 
International congresses are held every three years. The site of each is decided six years ahead, and the event is co-hosted by ICM and one of its member associations. Venues over the past 50 years have included Jerusalem, Kobe, Manila, Santiago, Sydney, Vancouver and Washington, as well as numerous European cities. These congresses have become the major regular focus for midwives’ global business, professional and scientific meetings. In addition, regional meetings and conferences are often held in the years between congresses.
 
The ICM's Mission is to "advance world-wide the aims and aspirations of midwives in the attainment of improved outcomes for women in their childbearing years, their newborn and their families wherever they reside".

The ICM is an official supporting organisation of Healthcare Information For All by 2015, a global initiative whose goals include: By 2015, every midwife will have access to the information they need to learn, to diagnose, to provide appropriate care and treatment, and to save lives.

Member associations

Since its founding, the ICM has grown from a small group of midwifery associations in western Europe to a major confederation of over 100 autonomous member associations from countries in every part of the globe.
Criteria for membership demand that each association is headed by midwives who determine their own governance and activities, and are committed to the mission, vision and aims of ICM.
	
Websites and Contacts of the Member Associations can be found on the ICM Website.

 A:   Afghanistan: Afghan Midwives Association, Argentina:  Colegio de Obstetricas de la Provincia de Buenos Aires, Australia: Australian College of Midwives, Austria - Österreichisches Hebammengremium
 B:   Bangladesh - Bangladesh Midwifery Society, Barbados - Barbados Nurses Association, Midwives Group, Belgium - Belgian Midwives Association (BMA), Benin - Association des Sages-Femmes du Bénin, Bosnia and Herzegowina - Udruzenje Babica u Bosni I Herscegovini, Brazil - Associação Brazileira de Obstetrizes e Enfermeiros Obstetras, Burkina Faso - Association Burkininabé des Sages-Femmes
 C:    Cambodia - Cambodia Midwives Association, Cameroon - Assocasfiasar, Canada - Canadian Association of Midwives, Chile - Colegio de Matronas de Chile, China - Zhejiang Midwives’ Association (An Affiliate of the Zhejiang Nurses’ Association), Croatia - Hrvatska Udruga Primalja, Cyprus - Cyprus Nurses and Midwives Association, Czech Republic - Czech Confederation of Midwives
 D:  Denmark - Danish Association of Midwives
E:  Ecuador - Federacion Nacional de Obstetrices y Obstetras del Ecuador, Estonia - Estonian Midwives Association, Ethiopia - The Ethiopian Nurse Midwives Association
F:  Finland - Federation of Finnish Midwives, France - Collège National des Sages-Femmes
G: Gabon - Association des Sages femmes du Gabon, Gambia - The Gambia Midwives' Association, Georgia - Midwives Association of Georgia (MAG), Germany - Bund Deutscher Hebammen, Ghana - Ghana Registered Midwives´ Association, Greece - The Hellenic Midwives' Association
H: Haiti - Association des Infirmieres Sages-Femmes d'Haiti, Hong Kong - Hong Kong Midwives' Association, Hungary - Országos Bábaszövetség
I: Iceland - Icelandic Midwives' Association, India - Society of Midwives of India, Indonesia - Indonesian Midwives Association, Iran - Iran Midwifery Population, Ireland - INMO Irish Nurses and Midwives Association, Israel - Israel Midwives´ Association, Italy - Italian Association of Midwives for Cultural Relations with Foreign Countries (AIORCE)
J: Jamaica - Jamaica Midwives' Association, Japan - Japanese Midwives' Association, Japan - Japan Academy of Midwifery, Japan - Midwives´ Division, Japanese Nursing Association
K: Kenya - Midwives' Chapter of the National Nurses Association of Kenya, Korea, Republic of - Korean Midwives´ Association
L: Latvia - Association of Midwives of Latvia, Lebanon - Association des Sages-Femmes Diplomées de la Faculté Francaise de Médecine, Lesotho - Independent Midwives Association Lesotho, Liberia - Liberian Midwives´ Association, Luxembourg - Association Luxembourgeoise des Sages-Femmes
M: Madagascar - Fédération Nationale des Sages Femmes de Madagascar, Malawi - The Association of Malawian Midwives, Mali - Association des Sages-Femmes du Mali (ASFM), Malta - Midwives Association of Malta, Mongolia - Mongolian Midwives and Feldsher's Association, Morocco- Association Marocaine de Sages-Femmes, Mozambique - Association of Midwives of Mozambique
N: Netherlands Koninklijke Nederlandse Organisatie van Verloskundigen, New Zealand - New Zealand College of Midwives Inc., Nigeria - Professional Association of Midwives of Nigeria, Norway - Norwegian Nurses' Association National Midwifery Section, Norway - Norwegian Association of Midwives, Namibia - Independent Midwives Association of Namibia (IMANA)
P: Pakistan - Midwifery Association of Pakistan, Papua New Guinea - Papua New Guinea Midwifery Society, Paraguay - Asociación de Obstetras del Paraguay (A.O.P.), Peru - Colegio de Obstetrices del Peru, Philippines - Integrated Midwives' Association of the Philippines, Philippines - National Capital Region Midwives Association Inc., Philippines - Philippine League of Government and Private Midwives Inc., Poland - Polish Midwives Association, Portugal - Associação Portuguesa Dos Enfermeiros Obstetras (APEO)
R: Republic of Macedonia - Macedonian Association of Nurses and Midwives, Russia - Interregional League of Midwives of Russia
S: Sarawak - Sarawak Midwives' Association, Senegal - Association Nationale es Sages-Femmes du Senegal (ANSFES), Sierra Leone - Sierra Leone Midwives' Association, Slovenia - Zbornica Zdravstvene Nege-Slovenije, South Africa - The Society of Midwives of South Africa, Spain - Asociacion Espanola de Matronas, Spain - Consejo General de Enfermeria (Vocalia Matrona), Spain - Federacion de Asociaciones de Matronas (FAME), Sri Lanka - Government Midwifery Service Association ´Janasuwasevana´, Suriname - Suriname Organization of Midwives, Sweden - Swedish Association of Midwives (Svenska Barnmorskeforbundet), Switzerland - Swiss Federation of Midwives
T: Taiwan - Taiwan Midwives Association, Tanzania - Tanzania Registered Midwives´ Association (TAMA), Trinidad & Tobago - Trinidad & Tobago Association of Midwives, Turkey - Midwives Association of Turkey,
U: Uganda - Uganda Private Midwives´ Association (UPMA), Uganda - Uganda National Association for Nurses and Midwives (UNANM), United Arab Emirates - Midwives Section, Emirates Nursing Association, United Kingdom - Association of Radical Midwives, United Kingdom - Independent Midwives´ Association, United Kingdom - Midwifery Society, Royal College of Nursing, United Kingdom - The Royal College of Midwives, United States of America - American College of Nurse-Midwives (ACNM), United States of America - Midwives' Alliance of North America (MANA), Uruguay - Asociacion Obstétrica del Uruguay
V: Vietnam - Vietnamese Association of Midwives
Y: Republic of Yemen - National Yemeni Midwives Association
Z: Zambia - Midwives Association of Zambia, Zimbabwe - Zimbabwe Confederation of Midwives

External links
 ICM website
 Official website for ICM 29th Triennial Congress, South Africa, June 2011
The Global Library of Women's Medicine   Safer Motherhood Section. Non-profit website offering freely downloadable material for healthcare professionals

Midwifery organizations
International professional associations
International organisations based in the Netherlands